The Oldsmobile Classic was a golf tournament on the LPGA Tour from 1992 to 2000. It was played at Walnut Hills Country Club in East Lansing, Michigan.

Winners
2000 Karrie Webb
1999 Dottie Pepper
1998 Lisa Walters
1997 Pat Hurst
1996 Michelle McGann
1995 Dale Eggeling
1994 Beth Daniel
1993 Jane Geddes
1992 Barb Mucha

References

Former LPGA Tour events
Golf in Michigan
Recurring sporting events established in 1992
Recurring sporting events disestablished in 2000
1992 establishments in Michigan
2000 disestablishments in Michigan
History of women in Michigan